Codemasters is a British video game developer and formerly publisher founded by David Darling and his brother Richard in 1986 and became a subsidiary of Electronic Arts in 2021. The headquarter of the studio is set in Southam, Warwickshire, while the company's 3 subsidiaries are set in Birmingham and Kuala Lumpur, Malaysia. The company was known for developing and publishing racing titles such as Colin McRae Rally, Micro Machines and TOCA. The company also released several other games in other genres, such as the action-adventure series Overlord, the tactical shooter series Operation Flashpoint and the Brian Lara Cricket series. In 2008, the company acquired the rights to develop and publish licensed Formula 1 video games. In the same year, the company acquired Sega Racing Studio from Sega and Codemasters Birmingham from Swordfish Studios.

List of video games

Cancelled games
Dragon Empires

References

Codemasters video games